Reginald Arthur Vyner (10 March 1839 – 28 September 1870) was a British Liberal Party  politician.

Vyner was the son of Henry Vyner and Lady Mary Gertrude Weddell, daughter of Thomas Philip de Grey. He never married.

Vyner was elected MP for Ripon at a by-election in 1860 – caused by the death of John Ashley Warre — and held the seat until 1868 when he stood down.

At some point, Vyner was also a Deputy Lieutenant in Yorkshire.

References

External links
 

Liberal Party (UK) MPs for English constituencies
UK MPs 1859–1865
1839 births
1870 deaths